Juana Núñez de Lara (1286 – 1351) was a daughter of Juan Núñez de Lara the Fat and his wife Teresa Díaz II de Haro of the lordship of Biscay. Juana is also known as la Palomilla or Lady of Lara.

Life
Juana was first married to Infante Henry of Castile, son of Ferdinand III of Castile and his first wife Elisabeth of Swabia. The marriage was childless and Henry died in 1304, leaving Juana a young widow.

Juana was married secondly to Ferdinand de la Cerda, son of Ferdinand de la Cerda and his wife Blanche of France. Blanche was a daughter of Louis IX of France and Margaret of Provence. Juana and Ferdinand had four children:
Juan Núñez III de Lara (1313–1350), married Maria de Haro
Blanche Núñez de Lara (1311–1347), married Juan Manuel, Prince of Villena
Margaret Núñez de Lara, a nun.
Maria Núñez de Lara, married Charles II of Alençon and was mother of Charles III of Alençon.

Their daughter, Blanca de La Cerda y Lara, was mother of Juana Manuel of Castile. Juana Manuel was married to king Henry II of Castile and was mother of king John I of Castile and Infanta Eleanor of Castile.

Juana's husband died in 1322, Juana herself died in Palencia in 1351.

Ancestry

References

Sources

1286 births
1351 deaths
13th-century Castilians
Juana
13th-century Spanish women
Juana